Madison Township is one of the twenty-five townships of Muskingum County, Ohio, United States.  The 2000 census found 487 people in the township.

Geography
Located in the northern part of the county, it borders the following townships:
Adams Township - northeast
Salem Township - southeast
Washington Township - south
Muskingum Township - southwest
Jefferson Township - west
Cass Township - northwest

No municipalities are located in Madison Township.

Name and history
It is one of twenty Madison Townships statewide.

In 1833, Madison Township had one saw mill, one flouring mill, one salt factory, one physician, one attorney, and several ancient mounds.

Government
The township is governed by a three-member board of trustees, who are elected in November of odd-numbered years to a four-year term beginning on the following January 1. Two are elected in the year after the presidential election and one is elected in the year before it. There is also an elected township fiscal officer, who serves a four-year term beginning on April 1 of the year after the election, which is held in November of the year before the presidential election. Vacancies in the fiscal officership or on the board of trustees are filled by the remaining trustees.

References

External links
County website

Townships in Muskingum County, Ohio
Townships in Ohio